Șieuț is a commune in Bistrița-Năsăud County, Transylvania, Romania. It is composed of four villages: Lunca (formerly Friș; Friss), Ruștior (Sajósebes), Sebiș (Sajófelsősebes) and Șieuț.

References

Communes in Bistrița-Năsăud County
Localities in Transylvania